Iraj Dastgerdi (born 31 December 1955) is an Iranian fencer. He competed in the individual and team épée events at the 1976 Summer Olympics.

References

External links
 

1955 births
Living people
Iranian male épée fencers
Olympic fencers of Iran
Fencers at the 1976 Summer Olympics
20th-century Iranian people